Soto is one of 18 parishes (administrative divisions)  in Aller, a municipality within the province and autonomous community of Asturias, in northern Spain.

Villages
 Acebedo
 Castañeo
 Los Estruḷḷones
 Orozá
 La Palombar
 Rucao
 Santana
 Soto
 Las Cargaeros
 La Casieḷḷa
 Espineo
 La Foz
 Pumardenuño
 El Turnu

References

Parishes in Aller